Bolshaya Areshevka is a rural locality (a selo) and the administrative centre of Bolsheareshevsky Selsoviet, Kizlyarsky District, Republic of Dagestan, Russia. The population was 1,565 as of 2010. There are 12 streets.

Geography 
Bolshaya Areshevka is located 34 km northeast of Kizlyar (the district's administrative centre) by road. Makarovskoye and Novye Bukhty are the nearest rural localities.

Nationalities 
Avars, Dargins, Russians, Tabasarans, Kumyks, Lezgins, Tsakhurs and Laks live there.

References 

Rural localities in Kizlyarsky District